Gwandi is an administrative ward in the Chemba District of the Dodoma Region of Tanzania.

In 2016 reports there were 3,834 people in the ward, from 7,971 in 2012, and 6,354 in 2002. The ward has .

References

Wards of Dodoma Region